Howard Irving Smith (August 12, 1893 – January 10, 1968) was an American character actor with a 50-year career in vaudeville, theatre, radio, films and television. In 1938, he performed in Orson Welles's short-lived stage production and once-lost film, Too Much Johnson, and in the celebrated radio production, "The War of the Worlds". He portrayed Charley in the original Broadway production of Death of a Salesman and recreated the role in the 1951 film version. On television, Smith portrayed the gruff Harvey Griffin in the situation comedy, Hazel.

Biography 
Howard Irving Smith was born August 12, 1893, in Attleboro, Massachusetts, to parents George H. Smith and Sybelle Pollard Smith.

Smith began as a concert singer, but his hopes of an opera career were ended after his service in the 77th Infantry Division in World War I. Enrico Caruso suggested that he try a musical act in vaudeville. He formed a team with his friend Harry Meeker and later, as a comedian, he shared bills with Frank Fay, Sophie Tucker, James Barton and Bessie Clayton.

In 1928, with big-time vaudeville ending, Smith landed a job on radio's popular  The Collier Hour, and received $35 for three minutes work. His radio career continued with The March of Time, Cavalcade of America, Forty Minutes in Hollywood and Crime Doctor. Smith created the role of Sergeant Velie in The Adventures of Ellery Queen. He played the role of Will Brown, Homer's father, on radio's The Aldrich Family and later reprised the role on the NBC television series.

A member of the repertory company of Orson Welles's CBS Radio series The Mercury Theatre on the Air and The Campbell Playhouse, Smith played the role of the ill-fated bomber commander in the 1938 production of "The War of the Worlds". Smith appears as Cuban plantation owner Joseph Johnson in Welles's rediscovered film Too Much Johnson — slapstick sequences that were to be integrated into a theatre production that was briefly staged in August 1938 before it was shelved.

After New York stage appearances in Solitaire, Decision and Dear Ruth,  Smith created the role of Charley in the original Broadway production of Death of a Salesman. He may be best remembered for his recreation of the role in the 1951 screen version.

His other film credits include Kiss of Death, Call Northside 777, The Street with No Name, State of the Union, A Face in the Crowd and No Time for Sergeants.  He made his film debut in 1918, in Young America.

On television, Smith played the overbearing boss Oliver Misrell in The Twilight Zone first-season episode, "A Stop at Willoughby" (1960), and also appeared in the 1962 episode, "Cavender Is Coming". In 1962, he was cast in the Perry Mason season six episode, "The Case of the Unsuitable Uncle", as character Frank Warden.

He was regularly featured on the 1960s TV series Hazel, as George Baxter's gruff client Harvey "Harv" Griffin.

His wife, actress and singer Lillian Boardman, died in 1953. Smith died January 10, 1968, in Hollywood, following a heart attack. He was cremated and his ashes are buried at Kensico Cemetery in Valhalla, New York.

Partial filmography 

 Young America (1918) as Jack Doray
 Too Much Johnson (1938) – Joseph Johnson
 Her Kind of Man (1946) – Bill Fellows
 Kiss of Death (1947) – Warden
 Call Northside 777 (1948) – K.L. Palmer
 State of the Union (1948) – Sam I. Parrish
 The Street with No Name (1948) – Commissioner Ralph Demory
 Cry Murder (1950) – Sen. Alden
 Death of a Salesman (1951) – Charley
 Never Wave at a WAC (1953) – Maj. Gen. Prentiss (uncredited)
 The Caddy (1953) – Golf Official
 The Court-Martial of Billy Mitchell (1955) – Committee Chairman (uncredited)
 A Face in the Crowd (1957) – J.B. Jeffries
 Don't Go Near the Water (1957) – Adm. Junius Boatwright
 No Time for Sergeants (1958) – Maj. Gen. Eugene Bush
 I Bury the Living (1958) – George Kraft
 Wind Across the Everglades (1958) – George Leggett
 Face of Fire (1959) – Sheriff Nolan
 Murder, Inc. (1960) – Albert Anastasia
 The Tom Ewell Show (1960, TV series) – Warren Prescott
 The Twilight Zone (1960–1962, TV Series) – Polk / Misrell
 Hazel (1961–1965, TV Series) – Harvey Griffin
 Bon Voyage! (1962) – Judge Henderson
 The Dakotas (1963, TV Series) – Ed Turner
 The Brass Bottle (1964) – Senator Grindle
 Vacation Playhouse (1964, TV Series) – T.J. Gittings
 Green Acres (1966) – Judge Clemens
 The John Forsythe Show (1966, TV Series) – Oakes
 The Mystery of the Chinese Junk (1967, TV Series) – Cummings
 Bewitched (1967, TV Series) – C.L.Morton
 The Hardy Boys: The Mystery of the Chinese Junk (1967) – Cummings (final film role)

References

External links 

1893 births
1968 deaths
20th-century American male actors
American male film actors
American male television actors
American male radio actors
American male stage actors
United States Army personnel of World War I
People from Attleboro, Massachusetts
Vaudeville performers
United States Army soldiers